Lewis Carl Billington (born 17 February 2004) is an English professional footballer who plays as a defender for Leek Town, on loan from Crewe Alexandra.

Billington signed a scholarship deal with Crewe Alexandra's Academy in 2020.

He made his Crewe debut on 10 April 2022 in an EFL League One game against Doncaster at Keepmoat Stadium, starting the game at right-back before being replaced by Sean Lawton in stoppage-time. He signed his first professional deal with the club at the end of the 2021–22 season.

In January 2023, Billington joined Leek Town on loan for an initial month.

Career statistics

References

External links

Living people
English footballers
English Football League players
Crewe Alexandra F.C. players
2004 births
Association football defenders